Joakim Skomsøy Bjerkås (born 15 January 1993) is a Norwegian professional footballer who plays for Sunndal on loan from Kristiansund, as a defender.

References

External links
Joakim Bjerkås at NFF

1993 births
Living people
Norwegian footballers
Kristiansund BK players
Levanger FK players
Norwegian First Division players
Eliteserien players
Association football defenders